LAHS is the fourth studio album by American rock band Allah-Las. It was released on October 11, 2019, by Mexican Summer.

Track listing
Credits adapted from liner notes.

Reception

LAHS has received positive reviews from critics. At Metacritic, the album received an average score of 70 out of 100 based on 8 reviews, indicating a "generally favourable" reception. In a four-star review for The Times, Will Hodgkinson said "[Allah Las'] fourth album is a particular delight, grooving along with Portuguese country rock ("Prazer Em Te Conhecer"), offering the musical equivalent of an afternoon spent in dry, heavy heat on "Houston" and sounding as if they might have just joined a New Age cult on the celestial "Holding Pattern", adding "their jingle-jangle shimmer makes you feel so good".

Personnel

Allah-Las
 Matt Correia – drums, percussion, vocals (4, 6)
 Spencer Dunham – bass guitar, vocals (13)
 Miles Michaud – rhythm guitar, keys, vocals (2, 10, 11)
 Pedrum Siadatian – lead guitar, keys, vocals (1, 3, 7, 8, 9)

Additional musicians
 Tim Hill – keys, lap steel guitar (2, 3, 9, 12)
 Jeff Luger – spoken word (7)
 John Anderson – bass (13)

Technical
 Allah-Las – production
 Jarvis Taveniere – production, engingeering, mixing
 Dave Cooley – mastering

Art
 Matt Correia – photography, layout, design
 Robbie Simon – layout, design
 Bailey Elder – additional layout

Charts

References 

2019 albums
Mexican Summer albums